Kiaeroceras is a slender, nearly stright shelled, cyrogomphoceratid (Nautiloidea-Discosorida) from the Upper Ordovician of northern Europe (e.g. Norway). The cross section of the shell is compressed, height greater than width. The body chamber is slightly contracted so as to narrow toward the aperture, which in some is slightly flared. The venter, narrowly rounded. The siphuncle is close to the venter, septal necks short, connecting rings thick, bullettes prominent.

Kiaeroceras is thought to be derived from Strandoceras although derivation is possibly from Cyrtogomphoceras, which is intermediary in form.

References
Flower, Rousseau H. and Curt Teichert, 1957; The Cephalopod Order Discosorida, in University of Kansas Paleontological Contributions, Mollusca Article 6, pp 1–144 (plates, figs) July 1, 1957. 
Curt Teichert 1964. Nautiloidea-Discosorida; Treatise on Invertebrate Paleontology Part K, Endoceratoidea, Actinoceratoidea, Nautiloidea. Geological Society of America.

Discosorida
Prehistoric nautiloid genera